Dysprosium(III) nitrate is an inorganic compound, a salt of dysprosium and nitric acid with the chemical formula Dy(NO3)3. The compound forms yellowish crystals, dissolves in water, forms a crystalline hydrate.

Synthesis
Anhydrous salt is obtained by the action of nitrogen dioxide on dysprosium(III) oxide:

The action of nitrogen dioxideon metallic dysprosium:

Physical properties
Dysprosium(III) nitrate forms yellowish crystals.

Forms a crystalline hydrate of the composition Dy(NO3)3*5H2O, which melts in its own crystallization water at 88.6 °C.

Soluble in water and ethanol, hygroscopic.

Chemical properties
Hydrated dysprosium nitrate thermally decomposes to form DyONO3, and further heating produces dysprosium oxide.

Application
Dysprosium(III) nitrate is used as a catalyst.

References

Dysprosium compounds
Nitrates